Yashima may refer to:

Places 
 Yashima, Akita
 Yashima, Kagawa, a place in Takamatsu, Kagawa
 Yashima, a former name of Takamatsu, Kagawa

Other uses 
 Battle of Yashima
 Japanese battleship Yashima
 Operation Yashima
 Yashima-ji, a Shingon temple in Yashima, Kagawa
 Yashima (surname)
 Yashima Station (disambiguation)
Yashima, "eight islands", a nickname for Japan